RP Mall is a shopping mall located at Kozhikode, India. The mall contains a multiplex in its second and third floor. The multiplex has six screens spread over an area of 25,000 sq.ft has a total capacity of 610 seats. The multiplex contains five public screens and a spa theatre for private screening. Two of the screens also has 3D facility. The mall has a multicusine food court and children play area. It is the first multiplex in the city of Kozhikode. The multiplex is named as PVS Film City.

References

Shopping malls in Kerala
Buildings and structures in Kozhikode
Shopping malls established in 2011
2011 establishments in Kerala